Kathy Young (born October 21, 1945) is an American musician; she was a teen pop singer during the early 1960s, whose rendition of "A Thousand Stars", at age 15, rose to No. 3 on Billboard Hot 100.

Biography
A native of Southern California, Young was born in the Orange County seat, Santa Ana. She rose to stardom in 1960, when producer Jim Lee of Indigo Records chose a Sun Valley-based band, The Innocents, to sing back-up vocals for her on a cover version of The Rivileers' 1954 recording of "A Thousand Stars". Two years earlier Lee had organized The Innocents for an appearance on Wink Martindale's pop music TV show.

In December 1960, two months after her 15th birthday, Kathy Young and The Innocents peaked at No. 6 on the R&B Singles chart, and at No. 3 on the Billboard Hot 100. Young's follow-up, "Happy Birthday Blues", peaked at No. 30 on the Hot 100 in 1961. Subsequent singles, such as "Magic Is the Night" and "The Great Pretender", failed to chart in the Top 40.

In July 1961 she appeared on DJ Alan Freed's highly publicized American road show.

In 1962 she followed Jim Lee to Monogram Records, recording solo and with Chicano rock singer Chris Montez. Still a teenager, she saw her promising career slowing to a standstill and, in 1964, traveled to London. There she married American singer-songwriter John Maus, aka John Walker, founder of The Walker Brothers. Her marriage to Maus lasted from 1965 to 1968.

Kathy returned to the US in 1969, remarrying two years later. Over the next 20 years she raised children and helped manage the family citrus ranch in Central California.  Following a move back to Los Angeles in 1994, she began working for a major international company, while also returning to her original passion, music.

In the 2000s she performed at numerous rock shows at venues such as the Greek Theatre in Los Angeles and New Jersey's Izod Center at the Meadowlands Sports Complex.

Kathy Young was inducted into the Doo-Wop Hall of Fame, presided over by Harvey Robbins. on October 12, 2014. at the North Shore Music Theater, in Beverly, Massachusetts.

Discography

Albums

Singles

References

External links
 Kathy Young I
 Kathy Young II
 Kathy Young & The Innocents I
 Kathy Young & The Innocents II
 Kathy Young & The Innocents III
 The Innocents I
 The Innocents II
 The Innocents III
 
 

1945 births
Living people
American women pop singers
Singers from California
People from Santa Ana, California
American expatriates in the United Kingdom
Doo-wop musicians
21st-century American women